Geteuma is a genus of longhorn beetles of the subfamily Lamiinae.

 Geteuma peraffinis Breuning, 1971
 Geteuma quadridentata (Coquerel, 1851)
 Geteuma quadriguttata Coquerel, 1852

References

Crossotini